Şəki is a village and municipality in the Shaki Rayon of Azerbaijan. It has a population of 2,360.

References

Populated places in Shaki District